Ecolibrium is a Sims-style game developed by Spanish studio StormBASIC games for the PS Vita with an environmental message. The player controls a virtual ecosystem in which to grow and care for flora and fauna by manipulating four variables - Water, Minerals, Vegetation, and Meat - in order to create a balanced ecosystem. The player gains and spends 'ecopoints' and also tackles a series of multi-stage challenges. Ecolibrium received "mixed" reviews, according to video game review aggregator Metacritic.

References

External links

2012 video games
PlayStation Vita-only games
Free-to-play video games
PlayStation Vita games
Simulation video games
Environmental education video games
Video games developed in Spain